Romulus Earl Whitaker (born 23 May 1943) is an American-Indian herpetologist, wildlife conservationist, and founder of the Madras Snake Park, the Andaman and Nicobar Environment Trust (ANET), and the Madras Crocodile Bank Trust.
In 2008, Whitaker was selected as an associate laureate in the 2008 Rolex Awards for Enterprise for his efforts to create a network of rainforest research stations throughout India.
In 2005, he was a winner of a Whitley Award for outstanding leadership in nature conservation. He used this award to found the Agumbe Rainforest Research Station in Karnataka, for the study of king cobras and their habitat.

For his work in wildlife conservation, he received the Padma Shri award in 2018.

Background and personal life
Whitaker (known as "Rom") was born in New York City, United States, to an American couple. His mother, Doris Norden, was an artist, and his father served in the United States Army. He has one older sister, Gail (b. 1939). After his parents divorced, his mother (who had custody of her children) married Rama Chattopadhyay, son of Harindranath and Kamaladevi Chattopadhyay. The family, including Rom and Gail, initially settled in New York City. In 1951, after the birth of Rom's half-sister Nina, they all moved to Bombay (now Mumbai). Rom's stepfather Rama Chattopadhyay was a pioneer in color film processing; he established India's first colour motion-picture processing lab in Worli, Mumbai. Rom's half-brother Neelkanth was born in Mumbai in 1953.

Rom continued his education (begun in New York) at the Kodaikanal International School (class of 1960). He studied briefly at the University of Wyoming. During the early Vietnam era, as an American citizen of the correct age, he was drafted into the U.S. Army, where he trained and served as a medic on a military base hospital in Japan. After his Army tour of duty, he apprenticed from 1963 to 1965 at the Miami Serpentarium with Bill Haast, whom he affectionately calls "guru". A short career in the Merchant Navy brought him back to India, and he has lived here ever since. He is now a naturalized Indian citizen. 

In 1974, Whitaker married Zai Whitaker, and the couple were blessed with two sons, Nikhil and Samir. However, the marriage eventually failed, and the couple were divorced. He later married again and his wife, Janaki Lenin, is an Indian. They live on a farm just south of Chennai, on the outskirts of Chengalpattu town in Tamil Nadu.

In 1986, well into his 40s, Whitaker earned a B.Sc. in wildlife management from Pacific Western University. This was merely a by-product of his lifelong passion for wildlife, especially of the reptilian variety. He is also a licensed amateur radio operator, holding an Indian callsign, VU2WIT.

Work in India

Whitaker was the founding director of the Snake Park in Chennai. The park was conceived to rehabilitate the Irula tribe, who are known for their expertise in catching snakes. The tribals were left jobless after the ban of snake trading. Whitaker helped the Irula tribe to get involved in extracting snake venom used for the production of antivenom drugs.
Rom is the founder-director of the Madras Crocodile Bank Trust Centre for Herpetology, actively involved in crocodile breeding and conservation programs.

Whitaker is currently coordinating an effort to save the gharial, a critically endangered species of Crocodilia on the brink of extinction, with less than 250 individuals left in Indian waters.

On 27 December 2010, the Minister for Environment and Forests, Jairam Ramesh, during a visit with Rom at the Madras Crocodile Bank, announced the formation of a National Tri-State Chambal Sanctuary Management and Coordination Committee for gharial conservation on 1,600 km2 of the National Chambal Sanctuary for gharials along the Chambal River in Madhya Pradesh, Rajasthan, and Uttar Pradesh. The committee will comprise representatives of the states' water resources ministries, state departments of irrigation and power, Wildlife Institute of India, Madras Crocodile Bank Trust, the Gharial Conservation Alliance, Development Alternatives, Ashoka Trust for Research in Ecology and the Environment, Worldwide Fund for Nature, and the divisional forest officers of the three states. The committee will plan strategies for protection of gharials and their habitat. This will involve further research on the species and its ecology and socioeconomic evaluation of dependent riparian communities. Funding for this new initiative will be mobilized as a subscheme of the Integrated Development of Wildlife Habitats in the amount of Rs.50 to 80 million (US$1 to 1.7 million) each year for five years. This project has long been advocated by Rom Whitaker.

Professional affiliations
Whitaker is a member of the advisory committee and the editorial board of the Bombay Natural History Society, correspondent of The Society for the Study of Amphibians and Reptiles, USA, advisor of Irula Tribal Women's’ Welfare Society, Afforestation Project, member of the Centre for Science and Education, New Delhi, and of the Centre for Environment Education, Ahmedabad. He co-founded the Tamil Nadu Society for Social Forestry Research and the Palni Hills Conservation Council. He is chief technical advisor of Irula Snake Catchers’ Industrial Cooperative Society and convenor of the Indian National Trust for Art and Cultural Heritage, Andaman and Nicobar Islands Chapter. He is honorary consultant of International Union for the Conservation of Nature and Natural Resources/Species Survival Commission (IUCN/SSC), vice chairman (Western Asia), IUCN/SSC Crocodile Specialist Group, member of IUCN/SSC Reptile and Amphibian Group and of IUCN/SSC Sea Turtle Specialist Group.

Popular culture
He was producer of the 1996, 53-minute, Super 16-mm wildlife documentary, The King and I, made for the National Geographic Channel Explorer program. This film on the natural history of the king cobra, the largest venomous snake in the world, received the Emmy Award for Outstanding News and Documentary Program Achievement, 1998. It also received Best Photography Award, Progetto Natura 8th Stambecco d'Oro Nature Film Festival, Turin, 1997; it was nominated for Best Cinematography, Jackson Hole Wildlife Film Festival 1997; Emmy Nomination for Outstanding Individual Achievement in a Craft-Cinematographers and News and Documentary, 1998, and  Best Animal Behaviour, Wildscreen Film Festival 1998.

In February 2007, he was the subject of a critically acclaimed documentary produced by Icon Films and WNET (and broadcast as Supersize Crocs on PBS's Nature series) on oversized crocodiles, which was filmed in India, Ethiopia, and Australia.

In January 2009, Whitaker was in another Nature documentary on real-life reptiles, such as Komodo dragons and dracos that inspired tales of dragons.

In February 2011, BBC Natural World followed Whitaker during his ongoing research into the causes and prevention of snake bites in India.

He has authored several scientific articles and popular books on reptiles, especially on snakes, including the comprehensive field guide, titled Snakes of India - The Field Guide in 2004.
 on the snakes of India.

In 2018, he received the Padma Shri, the fourth-highest civilian awards in India for distinguish services in wildlife conservation.

Honors, awards, and other recognitions
 He won the Whitley Award (considered as top U.K. conservation prize) in 2005 for his work.
 He became the associate laureate in Rolex Awards in 2008.
 A species of Indian boa, Eryx whitakeri, is named in honor of Romulus Whitaker.
A species of krait, Bungarus romulusi is named in honor of Romulus Whitaker.
 Romulus Whitaker was awarded the Padma Sri (the fourth-highest civilian award) by the government of India for his work done in the field of wildlife conservation in 2018.

References

External sources
I married a croc man - Romulus Whitaker Whitaker, Zai. Dec. 1994. National Wildlife Federation
Agumbe Rainforest Research Station (ARRS) Web Portal

1943 births
American emigrants to India
Nature conservation in India
Indian herpetologists
Indian conservationists
Indian people of American descent
20th-century American zoologists
20th-century Indian zoologists
Living people
Kodaikanal International School alumni
Military personnel from New York City
Naturalised citizens of India
Recipients of the Padma Shri in other fields
Former United States citizens
Members of the Bombay Natural History Society
Tyabji family